Emission Phase is the third full-length studio album by the band Detonation and was released by the French label Osmose Productions. The artwork was made by Eliran Kantor.

Track listing
 "Invoking the Impact" − 4:07
 "When Stone Turns to Ash" − 4:53
 "Craven Ablaze" − 4:14
 "Chokedamp" − 5:34
 "Defects of the Isolated Mind" − 4:17
 "Modulate" − 3:54
 "Into the Emission Phase" − 5:30
 "Infected" − 3:52
 "2nd Sun Ascending (instrumental)" − 1:57
 "Soul Severance" − 3:53
 "Reborn from the Radiance" − 4:38
 "Fallout (instrumental)" − 2:33

Credits

Band members
 Koen Romeijn − Vocals, Guitar
 Mike Ferguson − Guitar
 Thomas Kalksma − Drums
 Otto Schimmelpenninck − Bass guitar

Other
 Eliran Kantor − Cover Artwork

Detonation (band) albums
2007 albums
Albums with cover art by Eliran Kantor